Dement is a surname. Notable people with the surname include:

 Ada Belle Dement (1888–1945), American civil rights activist and suffrage
 George Dement (1922–2014), mayor of Bossier City, Louisiana, from 1989 to 2005
 Henry D. Dement (1840–1927), American politician
 John Dement (1804–1883), American politician and militia commander from Illinois
 Iris DeMent (born 1961), American singer and songwriter
 Kenneth Dement (1933–2013), American football player
 Mike Dement, American college basketball coach
 William C. Dement (born 1928), American sleep researcher

See also
 Ira De Ment (1931–2011), United States federal judge
 Dement Township, Ogle County, Illinois
 Dement Printing Company, a historic printing company in Meridian, Mississippi
 Dement House (disambiguation), several historic houses